Thomas Elliott Wright (born 10 January 1966) is a Scottish football coach and former player. A winger, he made nearly 450 appearances in the English Football League and Premier League, and also had short spells in the Scottish League. He was most recently a First-Team Coach at Oldham Athletic.

Career

Coaching
Having worked previously as his assistant manager at Oldham Athletic, Wright followed John Sheridan to League Two side Chesterfield to serve in the same capacity, in June 2009. He was made Caretaker Manager following the sacking of Sheridan on 27 August 2012, with Mark Crossley assisting.

Wright was appointed assistant head coach of Barnsley on 25 February 2015 

On 21 June 2018, he linked up with John Sheridan once more when being appointed the new assistant manager of Carlisle United.

Swindon Town
On 9 July 2019, he joined the coaching team at Swindon Town.

In November 2020, Swindon Town F.C. manager John Sheridan stressed that he had no plans to change the existing coaching team. He wanted Wright and Noel Hunt to stay at Swindon Town F.C. and was looking forward to working with them.

In the same month, it was reported that former Swindon Town F.C. manager Richie Wellens was planning to bring coach Wright to Salford City F.C. but Wright turned down his offer and continued to coach the Swindon Town F.C. team.

In February 2021, Wright admitted he wasn't sure whether he and manager Sheridan would keep their jobs if they won their Wigan Athletic F.C. game.

On 18 April 2021, following the resignation of first-team manager John Sheridan, Wright was placed in charge of the first-team with Swindon sitting bottom of the league, seven points off of safety with four games remaining.

Oldham return
On 25 January 2022, following the return of Sheridan to Oldham Athletic, Wright returned to the club as a coach. He left the club on 26 September 2022 following the recent change in management.

Corruption conviction

Wright was suspended by Barnsley on 28 September 2016 pending investigation into allegations that he had taken a £5,000 cash bribe to arrange player's transfers. His criminal trial was held in October 2019, at which he was convicted of soliciting and accepting bribes.

Bribery incident
In August 2018, the City of London Police announced that the former assistant coach of Barnsley F.C., Wright, had been charged with bribery offenses. In December 2019, Swindon Town F.C.'s first-team coach decided not to sack Wright. Although Wright had been found guilty of taking a bribe for leaking commercial information about players to the public, he was allowed to keep his assistant job.

Managerial Statistics

References

External links

1966 births
Living people
Footballers from Dunfermline
Scottish footballers
Association football wingers
Leeds United F.C. players
Oldham Athletic A.F.C. players
Leicester City F.C. players
Middlesbrough F.C. players
Bradford City A.F.C. players
St Johnstone F.C. players
Livingston F.C. players
Doncaster Rovers F.C. players
Premier League players
English Football League players
Scottish Football League players
Scottish football managers
Chesterfield F.C. managers
English Football League managers
Oldham Athletic A.F.C. non-playing staff
Chesterfield F.C. non-playing staff
Barnsley F.C. non-playing staff
Carlisle United F.C. non-playing staff
Swindon Town F.C. non-playing staff
Swindon Town F.C. managers